Olivier van Noort (1558 – 22 February 1627) was a Dutch merchant captain and pirate and the first Dutchman to circumnavigate the world.

Olivier van Noort was born in 1558 in Utrecht. He left Rotterdam on 2 July 1598 with four ships and a plan to attack Spanish possessions in the Pacific and to trade with China and the Spice Islands during the Eighty Years' War between the Netherlands and Spain. His ships were poorly equipped, especially in the way of armament, and the crews were unruly.

Nonetheless, Van Noort sailed through the Strait of Magellan, and captured a number of ships (Spanish and otherwise) along the Pacific coast of South America. While in the strait his men killed around forty indigenous Selknam, in what was the bloodiest recorded event in the strait until then.

He lost two ships on the way due to a storm, including his largest ship, the Hendrick Frederick, which was wrecked on Ternate in the Maluku Islands. In November and December 1600, he established a berth for his two remaining ships, Mauritius and Eendracht, in the surroundings of Corregidor Island at Manila Bay in the Philippines. From there he engaged in what were perceived by the Spanish as pirate activities, targeting the sailing route to and from Manila. This situation was ended after the naval combat of Fortune Island on December 14, 1600. The Spanish lost their flagship, the galleon San Diego (its wreck would be found in 1992 and yield a treasure in porcelain and gold pieces) but the Spanish captured the Dutch Eendracht, making van Noort's position untenable and forcing him to retire from the Philippines.

Van Noort returned to Rotterdam via what would become the Dutch East Indies and the Cape of Good Hope on 26 August 1601 with his last ship, the Mauritius, and 45 of originally 248 men. The venture barely broke even, but was the inspiration for more such expeditions. The united Dutch East India Company was formed a few months later.

Van Noort's voyage is also told by Hans Koning in the book The Golden Keys (Doubleday 1956, 1970), a fictionalized retelling of the voyage for children.

References

Further reading
 Gerhard, P. Pirates of the Pacific, 1575–1742. Glendale, Ca: A.H. Clark Co., 1990. 
 Gerhard, P. Pirates of New Spain, 1575–1742. Mineola, Ny: Courier Dover Publications, 2003. 
 Lane, K. E. Pillaging the Empire: Piracy in the Americas, 1500–1750. Armunk, New York: M.E. Sharpe, 1998. 
 
 Schmidt, B. Innocence Abroad: The Dutch Imagination and the New World, 1570–1670. New York: Cambridge University Press, 2001. 
 Silverberg, R. The Longest Voyage: Circumnavigation in the Age Of Discovery (1972)  1997 Ohio University Press, 
 Bennett, R. S. "Australia and its neighbours, 1494–1799: Western powers reach out to the East and Pacific Ocean" Auckland, New Zealand RSB Publications 2014 .

External links
 
 

1558 births
1627 deaths
Circumnavigators of the globe
People from Utrecht (city)
16th-century Dutch explorers
17th-century Dutch explorers
Dutch people of the Eighty Years' War (United Provinces)